HMS Miranda was a 14-gun (15-gun from 1856) wooden screw sloop of the Royal Navy. As part of the 1847 Program, she was designed by John Fincham, Master Shipwright of Portsmouth and is considered an improved Rattler with the design approved on 3 November 1847. She was ordered on the 25th of April 1847 with the name Grinder from Royal Dockyard, Sheerness. On the 3rd of November 1847 she was reordered as the Miranda from Sheerness Dockyard. Launched in 1851, she was completed to see action in the Russian War of 1854 - 55. In 1854 she was in the White Sea and participated in the bombardment of the Port of Kola. She then participated in the Sea of Azov during 1855. Two of her crew were awarded the Victoria Cross for their bravery. Towards the end of her career she transported troops during the New Zealand war. She was reclassified as a corvette by 1862, She was sold for breaking in December 1869.

Grinder was the second named vessel since it was introduced for a tender of unknown origin and sold on 22 August 1832.

Miranda was the first named vessel in the Royal Navy.

Construction and specifications
Miranda’s keel was laid in September 1848 at Royal Dockyard, Sheerness and launched on 18 March 1851. Her builder’s measure tonnage was 1,039 tons (as built 1,062) and displaced 1,350 tons.

Her machinery was supplied by Robert Napier & Sons of Govan. She shipped two rectangular fire tube boilers. She had a single screw propeller driven through gearing. Her machinery was installed at Robert Napier and Sons shipyard in Glasgow at a cost of £14,235 during 1852. The pictorial record shows Miranda with a full ship rig in 1862, which makes it likely that she carried this rig for her entire life.

Her initial armament consisted of fourteen Monk's ‘C’ 1839 32-pounder 42 hundredweight (cwt) muzzle loading smooth bore (MLSB) 8.5-foot solid shot guns on broadside trucks. In 1856 she was rearmed with a single 68-pounder MLSB of 87 cwt 10-foot solid shot gun on a pivot mount and ten Monk's ‘C’ 1839 32-pounder 42 cwt MLSB solid shot guns plus four Armstrong 20-pounder breach loading (BL) of 16 cwt on broadside trucks.

Trials

Miranda was completed for sea on 9 March 1854 at a cost of £48,393 (including hull of £24,232 and machinery of £14,235 and fitting £9,926).

Commissioned service

First commission
 
She commissioned at Sheerness on 25 February 1854 under the command of Captain Edmund M. Lyons, RN for service in the Baltic Sea during the Russian War of 1854 - 55. She did not sail for the Baltic, instead she joined Captain Erasmus Ommanney's Squadron for service in the White Sea.  The Squadron consisting of Eurydice, Miranda, Brisk plus two French ships scoured the White Sea for Russian Ships. Not finding any Russian Ships the Squadron destroyed the Port of Kola on the 24th of August before withdrawing before the onset of Winter. Her crew received the Baltic medal even though she did not serve in the Baltic. She returned to Portsmouth in September 1854.

In 1855 she deployed to the Black Sea for operations in the Sea of Azov. On 3 June 1855 at Siege of Taganrog on Sea of Azov, Boatswain Henry Cooper and Lieutenant Cecil William Buckley of Miranda landed destroying equipment and setting fire to government buildings. This despite the town being under bombardment and garrisoned by 3,000 Russian troops. For this action the pair were awarded the Victoria Cross. Captain Edmund Moubray Lyons of Miranda reported on 29 May 1855 that in the first four days of the squadron entering the Sea of Azov, the enemy had lost four steamers of war, 246 merchant vessels, together with corn and flour magazines to the value of at least £150,000. During the Kerch operations on 17 June, Captain Lyons was mortally wounded, dying on the 23rd. Captain Robert Hall took Command on the 24th as the Senior Officer in the Strait of Kerch. Upon the cessation of Hostilities, Miranda returned to Home Waters paying off at Sheerness on 21 April 1857.

Second commission
Miranda recommissioned at Sheerness on 4 October 1860 under the command of Commander Henry C. Glyn, RN for the Australia Station.  During the early 1860s she took part in the New Zealand Wars; in 1863 being used to land troops at Pūkorokoro, Waikato (later renamed Miranda in her honour). On 29 August 1861 Captain Robert Jenkins assumed command. She returned to Sheerness to decommission on 3 June 1865.

Disposal
Miranda was sold for breaking to C Lewis on 2 December 1869.

Notes

References
 Lyon Winfield, The Sail & Steam Navy List, All the Ships of the Royal Navy 1815 to 1889, by David Lyon & Rif Winfield, published by Chatham Publishing, London © 2004, 
 The Navy List, published by His Majesty's Stationery Office, London
 Winfield, British Warships in the Age of Sail (1817 – 1863), by Rif Winfield, published by Seaforth Publishing, England © 2014, e, Chapter 12 Screw Sloops, Vessels ordered or reordered as steam screw sloops (from 1845), Reynard
 Colledge, Ships of the Royal Navy, by J.J. Colledge, revised and updated by Lt Cdr Ben Warlow and Steve Bush, published by Seaforth Publishing, Barnsley, Great Britain, © 2020, e  (EPUB), Section G (Grinder) Section M (Miranda)

 

Sloops of the Royal Navy
Victorian-era sloops of the United Kingdom
Ships built in Sheerness
1851 ships
Crimean War naval ships of the United Kingdom